The men's 156.4 km road race competition at the 2006 Asian Games was held on 3 December at the Cycling Street Circuit.

Schedule
All times are Arabia Standard Time (UTC+03:00)

Results 
Legend
DNF — Did not finish
DSQ — Disqualified

References

External links 
Official website

Road Men